R. E. Edmonds was a college basketball coach.

He served as head coach for LSU basketball for one season during the 1918–1919 season. Long had an overall record of 1–0 during his one season as head coach.

References

College men's basketball head coaches in the United States
LSU Tigers basketball coaches